Pine Forest is a city in Orange County, Texas, United States. The population was 487 at the 2010 census. It is part of the Beaumont–Port Arthur Metropolitan Statistical Area.

Geography

Pine Forest is located at  (30.174274, –94.035671).

Demographics

As of the census of 2000, there were 632 people, 223 households, and 177 families residing in the city. The population density was 228.3 people per square mile (88.1/km2). There were 232 housing units at an average density of 83.8 per square mile (32.3/km2). The racial makeup of the city was 97.63% White, 0.63% Native American, and 1.74% from two or more races. Hispanic or Latino of any race were 2.53% of the population.

There were 223 households, out of which 37.2% had children under the age of 18 living with them, 61.9% were married couples living together, 12.1% had a female householder with no husband present, and 20.2% were non-families. 17.0% of all households were made up of individuals, and 7.2% had someone living alone who was 65 years of age or older. The average household size was 2.83 and the average family size was 3.18.

In the city, the population was spread out, with 30.1% under the age of 18, 6.8% from 18 to 24, 28.0% from 25 to 44, 24.2% from 45 to 64, and 10.9% who were 65 years of age or older. The median age was 35 years. For every 100 females, there were 101.3 males. For every 100 females age 18 and over, there were 101.8 males.

The median income for a household in the city was $43,000, and the median income for a family was $46,058. Males had a median income of $36,250 versus $19,063 for females. The per capita income for the city was $18,308. About 5.2% of families and 5.8% of the population were below the poverty line, including 5.4% of those under age 18 and 8.5% of those age 65 or over.

Education
The City of Pine Forest is served by the Vidor Independent School District, which is a school district in the county.

References

External links
 Handbook of Texas Online Entry for Pine Forest, Texas

Cities in Orange County, Texas
Cities in Texas
Cities in the Beaumont–Port Arthur metropolitan area